American Splendor is a series of autobiographical comic books written by Harvey Pekar and drawn by a variety of artists. The first issue was published in 1976 and the last one in September 2008 (Pekar died in 2010), with publication occurring at irregular intervals. Publishers were, at various times, Harvey Pekar himself, Dark Horse Comics, and DC Comics.

The comics have been adapted into a film of the same name and a number of theatrical productions.

Origins 
Despite comic books in the United States being traditionally the province of fantasy-adventure and other genre stories, Pekar felt that the medium could be put to wider use:

Pekar's philosophy of the potential of comics is also expressed in his often repeated statement that "comics are words and pictures. You can do anything with words and pictures". In an interview with Walrus Comix, Pekar described how the idea of producing his own comic book developed. In 1972 when Crumb was visiting him in Cleveland, Pekar showed him his story ideas. Not only did Crumb agree to draw some of them but also offered to show them to other artists to draw. By 1975, Pekar decided to produce and publish his own comic book.

Recurring character Toby Radloff first appeared in American Splendor #9 (1984), as did Joyce Brabner. Pekar and Brabner's adopted daughter, Danielle, was first introduced in American Splendor: Bedtime Stories (1999).

Themes 
The stories in American Splendor concern the everyday life of Pekar in Cleveland, Ohio, told in a brutally frank style akin to the writing of Henry Miller. Pekar's stories eschew traditional narrative structure, focusing on small moments and observations. As Robert Pulcini, co-writer and co-director of the American Splendor film, said: "The whole point of the American Splendor comics is that life doesn't really organize itself well".

Situations covered include Pekar's job as a file clerk at a Veteran's Affairs hospital and his relations with colleagues and patients there. There are also stories about Pekar and his relations with friends and family, including his second wife, Lark (issues #5, #7), his third wife, Joyce Brabner (issue #9 onward), and their adopted daughter, Danielle. Other stories concern everyday situations such as Pekar's troubles with his car, money, his health, and his concerns and anxieties in general. Several issues (#14, #13, #18) give accounts of Pekar's becoming a recurring guest on the NBC television show Late Night with David Letterman, including a 1987 interview segment in which Pekar criticized Letterman for ducking criticism of General Electric, the parent company of NBC. American Splendor sometimes departs from Pekar's own life, with stories about jazz musicians (#23), the artists for his comics (#25), and a three-issue miniseries American Splendor: Unsung Hero (#29–31), which chronicles the Vietnam experience of Pekar's African-American co-worker Robert McNeill.

Artists 
Pekar was not an artist himself, incapable of "drawing a straight line", according to a line in the film version of his story, so he recruited his friend, underground comics artist Robert Crumb, to help launch American Splendor. As Crumb described it:

As The Complete Crumb Comics co-editor Robert Fiore wrote about the Pekar/Crumb collaborations:

As things evolved, however, Crumb explained:

In addition to Crumb, Pekar's most well-known and longest-running collaborators included Gary Dumm, Greg Budgett, Spain Rodriguez, Joe Zabel, Gerry Shamray, Frank Stack, Mark Zingarelli, and Joe Sacco. Other notable American Splendor illustrators include Alison Bechdel, Brian Bram, Chester Brown, Alan Moore, David Collier, Drew Friedman, Dean Haspiel, Val Mayerik, Josh Neufeld,  Jim Woodring, and Ed Piskor. The later Vertigo Comics-published issues employed a new crop of artists, including Ty Templeton, Richard Corben, Hunt Emerson, Eddie Campbell, Gilbert Hernandez, Ho Che Anderson, and Rick Geary.

Publication history 
Pekar produced seventeen issues of American Splendor from 1976 to 1993 — usually each May — which, except for the last few issues, he also self-published and self-distributed. By keeping back issues in print and available (contrary to the industry practice of the time), Pekar continued to receive income on previously completed work, although at the time some of them were published, according to his Comics Journal interview (1985), he was losing thousands of dollars per year on the books. Starting in 1994, additional American Splendor were published by Dark Horse Comics, although these issues are not numbered. They include the two-issue American Splendor: Windfall and several themed issues such as American Splendor: Transatlantic Comics and American Splendor: On the Job. In September 2006, a four-issue American Splendor mini-series was published by the DC Comics imprint Vertigo. A second four-issue miniseries was published by DC in 2008.

Collected editions 
Many stories from American Splendor have been collected into trade paperbacks from various publishers, their material not (for the most part) overlapping:
 American Splendor: The Life and Times of Harvey Pekar (Doubleday, 1986) 
 More American Splendor (Doubleday, 1987) 
 The New American Splendor Anthology (Four Walls Eight Windows, 1991) 
 American Splendor Presents: Bob & Harv's Comics, with R. Crumb (Four Walls Eight Windows, 1996) 
 American Splendor: Unsung Hero, with David Collier (Dark Horse, 2003) 
 Best of American Splendor  (Ballantine Books, 2005) 
 American Splendor: Another Day (DC/Vertigo, 2007) 
 American Splendor: Another Dollar (DC/Vertigo, 2009)

Graphic novels
Pekar wrote two larger works which carry the American Splendor label: Our Movie Year (Ballantine Books, 2004), a collection of comics written about or at the time of the American Splendor film, and Ego & Hubris: The Michael Malice Story (Ballantine, 2006), a biography of the early life of the author Michael Malice.

Pekar also wrote two graphic novels which are not officially labeled American Splendor but which should arguably be considered part of it: Our Cancer Year (Four Walls Eight Windows, 1994), co-written with Pekar's wife Joyce Brabner and illustrated by Frank Stack, covering the year when Pekar was diagnosed with cancer; and The Quitter (DC Comics, 2005), illustrated by Dean Haspiel, which deals with Pekar's youth.

 Our Cancer Year, with Joyce Brabner and Frank Stack (Four Walls Eight Windows, 1994) 
 American Splendor: Our Movie Year (Ballantine Books, 2004) 
 The Quitter, with Dean Haspiel (DC/Vertigo, 2005) 
 American Splendor Presents: Ego & Hubris - The Michael Malice Story, with Gary Dumm (Ballantine Books, 2006)

Adaptations

Theatrical productions
Theatrical productions based on American Splendor have been mounted over the years:
 September–October 1985 – Adapted and directed by Conrad Bishop, with Herb O'Dell as Harvey. Produced by The Independent Eye in Lancaster, Pennsylvania
 November 1987 – Adapted by Lloyd Rose and directed by James C. Nicola, with Richard Bauer as Harvey, Isiah Whitlock Jr. as Mr. Boats, and Brigid Cleary and Anderson Matthews in supporting roles. Produced by Arena Stage in the Old Vat Room in Washington, DC
 September 1990 – September 1991 – Adapted and directed by Vince Waldron, with Dan Castellaneta as Harvey, Andy Wilson as Mr. Boats, and Richard Kuhlman, Steve Sheridan, Monica Horan, David O'Shea, and Siobhan Fallon Hogan in supporting roles. Produced at the Theatre/Theater in Hollywood, California (and represented in fictionalized form in the American Splendor movie, with Donal Logue as Harvey and Molly Shannon as Joyce)

Film

In 2003 a movie adaptation featuring Paul Giamatti playing Pekar (as well as appearances by Pekar himself) and Hope Davis as his wife was released to critical acclaim and first honors at the Sundance Film Festival, in addition to the Writers Guild of America Award for best adapted screenplay. The film was written and directed by documentarians Shari Springer Berman and Robert Pulcini, and was filmed entirely on location in Cleveland and Lakewood in Ohio. At the 2003 Cannes Film Festival, the film received the FIPRESCI critics award. It was also nominated for Best Adapted Screenplay at the 2003 Academy Awards.

References

Sources 
  (Harvey Pekar)
  (Dark Horse Comics)

External links 
 Harvey Pekar's Artists at Josh Neufeld's website
 Radio interviews with Pekar, NPR.org
 An article about issue #7
 American Splendor at Toonopedia. Archived from the original on April 4, 2012.

Autobiographical comics
1976 comics debuts
Slice of life comics
Comics anthologies
Underground comix
American comics adapted into films
Comics by Robert Crumb
Comics set in Ohio
Cleveland in fiction
Works set in hospitals